The Tallapoosa River runs  from the southern end of the Appalachian Mountains in Georgia, United States, southward and westward into the Appalachian foothills in Alabama. It is formed by the confluence of McClendon Creek and Mud Creek in Paulding County, Georgia. Lake Martin at Dadeville, Alabama is a large and popular water recreation area formed by a dam on the river.

There are four hydroelectric dams on the Tallapoosa: Yates, Thurlow, Martin and Harris dams. They are important sources of electricity generation for Alabama Power (a unit of the Southern Company) and recreation for the public.

Description
The Tallapoosa River, especially its lower course, was a major population center of the Creek Indians before the early 19th century. The contemporary name of the river is from the Creek words Talwa posa, which mean "Grandmother Town". The Creek consider the Tallapoosa branch of their tribe to be one of the oldest.

Horseshoe Bend National Military Park, a U.S. National Military Park managed by the National Park Service, is located along the banks of the Tallapoosa River just upstream from Lake Martin. It preserves a battle site associated with the Creek War.

The river below Thurlow Dam provides a short run of outstanding Class II, III and IV whitewater kayaking.

Tallapoosa, Georgia is named for the river, which runs near the town.

Impoundments
The first hydroelectric dam in Alabama was built on the Tallapoosa River in 1902, by Henry C. Jones, an Auburn University electrical engineer, at the site of the current Yates Dam. It was destroyed in the flood of 1919 but rebuilt. The dam then belonged to the Montgomery Light & Water Power Company. In 1928 it was replaced by the Yates Dam.

There are four hydroelectric dams on the Tallapoosa River: Yates Dam, Thurlow Dam, Martin Dam, and R.L. Harris Dam.

The table below outlines the four impoundments (dams) on the Tallapoosa River from south to north.

Significant tributaries
The Tallapoosa River's drainage has many significant tributaries which reflected below based on their location within the watershed.

Advocates
The Coosa-Alabama River Improvement Association, founded in 1890 in Gadsden, Alabama to promote navigation on the Coosa River is a leading advocate of the economic, recreational and environmental benefits of the Coosa and Tallapoosa River systems.

The Alabama Rivers Alliance works to unite the citizens of Alabama to protect peoples right to clean, healthy, waters.

Alabama Water Watch is dedicated to volunteer citizen monitoring of water quality in Alabama Rivers.

The Alabama Power Foundation is a non-profit foundation providing grants for watershed, environmental and community projects along the Tallapoosa River and within the state of Alabama

The Coosa River Basin Initiative is a grassroots environmental organization with the mission of informing and empowering citizens so that they may become involved in the process of creating a clean, healthy and economically viable Coosa River Basin.

Major cities
A number of significant cities lie on the banks of the Tallapoosa River. They include:
 Heflin, Alabama - headwaters
 Buchanan, Georgia - headwaters
 Tallapoosa, Georgia - headwaters
 Wedowee, Alabama - near R. L Harris Lake (Lake Wedowee)
 Lineville, Alabama - near R.L harris Lake  (Lake Wedowee
Wadley, Alabama- on the banks of the Tallapoosa River
 Alexander City, Alabama - north flank of Lake Martin
 Dadeville, Alabama - south flank of Lake Martin
 Tallassee, Alabama - site of Lower Tallassee Dam
 Wetumpka, Alabama - near confluence with Coosa River forming the Alabama River
 Montgomery, Alabama - Tallapoosa River is major source (60%) of drinking water for city.

References

Notes

External links

 

Rivers of Alabama
Rivers of Georgia (U.S. state)
Rivers of Elmore County, Alabama
Rivers of Paulding County, Georgia
Rivers of Tallapoosa County, Alabama
Rivers of Randolph County, Alabama
ACT River Basin
Alabama placenames of Native American origin
Georgia placenames of Native American origin